Torsten Schweiger (born 29 February 1968) is a German politician. Born in Gräfenhainichen, Saxony-Anhalt, he represents the CDU. Torsten Schweiger served as a member of the Bundestag from the state of Saxony-Anhalt from 2017 to 2021.

Life 
He became member of the bundestag after the 2017 German federal election. He is a member of the Committee on the Environment, Nature Conservation and Nuclear Safety and the Committee on Construction, Housing, Urban Development and Communities.

References

External links 

  
 Bundestag biography 

1968 births
Living people
Members of the Bundestag for Saxony-Anhalt
Members of the Bundestag 2017–2021
Members of the Bundestag for the Christian Democratic Union of Germany

21st-century German politicians
People from Wittenberg (district)